Caroline Grills (née Mickelson; between 1888 and 1890 – 6 October 1960) was an Australian serial killer who poisoned her victims. She was predominantly a comfort killer, who murdered well-off members of her extended family to maintain a respectable lifestyle, but her later murders had more unclear motives.

Biography
Grills was born to George Michelson and Mary (née Preiers) in Balmain, Sydney, at some point between 1888 and 1890. She married Richard William Grills on 22 April 1908, with whom she had four sons.

She first became a murder suspect in 1947 after the deaths of four family members: her 87-year-old stepmother Christine Mickelson; relatives by marriage Angelina Thomas and John Lundberg; and sister in law Mary Anne Mickelson. Authorities tested tea she had given to two additional family members (Christine Downey and John Downey of Redfern) on 13 April 1953, and detected the then-common household rat poison, thallium. At the time, thallium was easy to buy over the counter in New South Wales. Mickelson had inherited from Grills' father a house in Gladesville, and Grills was speculated to have murdered her to inherit it. Similarly, Thomas was a close family friend of the Grills couple and had left her holiday home in the Blue Mountains to the couple.

Grills, a short woman who wore thick-rimmed dark glasses, commonly served her friends and in-laws tea, cakes and biscuits. She appeared in court charged with four murders and three attempted murders (the third being Eveline Lundberg, of Redfern, Christine Downey's mother) in October 1953. She was convicted on 15 October 1953 and sentenced to death, but her sentence was later changed to life in prison. She became affectionately known as "Aunt Thally" (a punning reference to "Aunt Sally") to other inmates of Sydney's Long Bay prison. In October 1960, she was rushed to the Prince Henry Hospital at Randwick where she died from peritonitis from a ruptured gastric ulcer. In the months that followed more cases of thallium poisoning were stated, including notably, prominent Australian Rugby League footballer Bobby Lulham.

See also
List of serial killers by country
Recipe for Murder (film)

References

 Hidden Evidence: Forty true crimes and how forensic science helped solve them by David Owen (Firefly Books, September 2000).
Murder! 25 True Australian Crimes by Vivien Encel & Alan Sharpe

1960 deaths
1947 murders in Australia
1950 murders in Australia
1953 murders in Australia
1950s murders in Australia
19th-century Australian women
20th-century Australian women
Australian female serial killers
Australian people convicted of murder
Deaths from peritonitis
People convicted of murder by New South Wales
People from Sydney
Poisoners
Prisoners sentenced to life imprisonment by New South Wales
Prisoners who died in New South Wales detention
Serial killers who died in prison custody
Thallium poisoning
Year of birth unknown